The Rosiers–Joseph Migneret Garden is a green space located in the 4th arrondissement of Paris.

Location 
The garden is located between the rue des Francs-Bourgeois and the rue des Rosiers in the heart of the historic quarter of Le Marais. It can be accessed either by the courtyard of the hôtel de Coulanges at 35-37, rue des Francs-Bourgeois, or by number 10, rue des Rosiers.

Origins of the name 
The garden takes its name after Joseph Migneret, the director of the "École élémentaire des Hospitalières-Saint-Gervais", a boys' school located nearby. During World War II, Migneret showed active resistance by providing false papers to fleeing Jews and sheltering many of his former students, saving them from deportation and death.

Description 
Because of this, the garden is divided into several areas.

The first part of the garden can be accessed through the Hôtel de Coulanges, which today houses the "Maison de l'Europe de Paris"; it consists of a large rectangle of semi-shaded lawn (four birches are planted there) with a children's play area, surrounded by a curtain of wild cane. Different species are planted here: wild lilac, Mexican orange blossom, white dogwood, fescue, fountain grass and feather grass.

From this point of view a surprising 35 meters high chimney can be observed, which belongs to "La Société des Cendres", which used to process filings and off-cuts of gold and silver left over from workshops.

A second and smaller part of the garden, behind the Hôtel Barbes, shows an inviting dry path between a creeping fig tree and a chestnut tree, along which are a few stopping places with overhanging vegetation.

The third and final part of the garden is located behind the Hôtel d'Albret and offers a garden 'shared' between the local residents, espaliers, and highlights one of the 77 towers of the Wall of Philip II Augustus, a listed historical monument.

Despite its degraded condition, the tower remains very recognisable. Over the centuries, attached to the property of the Hôtel d'Albret, it served as a summer dining-room, and, later on, as a chapel.

The bustling rue des Rosiers can be reached through the third part of the garden, via a small covered walkway at number 10.

History 
The public garden was created in 2007 and completed in 2014.

Annexes 
This site is serviced by the Saint-Paul metro station.

See also 
 List of parks and gardens in Paris
 4th arrondissement of Paris
 Paris

References 

Parks in France
Gardens in Paris